Choi Dong-won (Hangul: 최동원, Hanja: 崔東原) (May 24, 1958 – September 14, 2011) was a South Korean pitcher in the KBO League who played for the Lotte Giants and Samsung Lions. Choi batted and threw right-handed. He was born in Busan.

Amateur career
In 1975, Choi gained national attention at the Champions Invitational Tournament where he threw a complete game no-hitter against 1974 national champion Kyungbuk High School and took another no-hitter into the ninth inning in the team's next game before it was broken up by an infield single. In 1976, he led his team to win the Blue Dragon Flag National Championship, setting a high-school record for most strikeouts in a major-tournament game with 20 in the semifinal and earning 4 out of the team's 5 wins during the tourney. In September 1976, Choi was selected for the South Korean junior national team and competed in the 3–game friendly series against Japan where he hurled a one-run complete game victory in Game 1, and racked up another victory the very next day in Game 2 coming up on relief in the third inning and throwing seven innings of one-run ball.

Upon graduation from high school, Choi entered Yonsei University and played college baseball from 1977 to 1980. In November 1977, Choi was first called up to the South Korea senior baseball team and played an important role in the team's first world championship at the 1977 Intercontinental Cup held in Nicaragua.

After graduation from Yonsei University in 1981, Choi signed with the Lotte amateur baseball team. In August 1981, Choi competed for South Korea in the 1981 Intercontinental Cup where he posted a 2–0 record and an ERA of 1.32. Choi took a perfect game with 11 strikeouts into the bottom of the ninth inning against Canada in round-robin phase before giving up a single. However, he was eventually named the tourney's Best Pitcher.

Professional career

Toronto Blue Jays
After the impressive performances at the 1981 Intercontinental Cup in Canada, the Toronto Blue Jays showed a strong interest in Choi, regarding him as having the potential to play in the big league immediately.

The Blue Jays' scouts went to see Choi six times before signing him to a major league contract reportedly worth around $250,000. Meanwhile, South Korea was in the process of forming its own professional baseball league. When the government discovered Choi was heading to Toronto, it threatened to jail the scouts if they tried to leave the country with the contract.

The Blue Jays planned on bringing Choi to Blue Jays' spring training for the 1983 season, but the government intervened again.

Choi was given a choice: Serve a mandatory military commitment before going to Canada, or pitch in the Korean professional league and have his military service waived. Choi eventually opted for the latter, declaring for the KBO Draft after the 1982 Amateur World Series.

Lotte Giants
Choi was selected by the Lotte Giants in the first round of the 1983 KBO Draft.

He had a respectable rookie season, posting a 9–16 record and an ERA of 2.89 with 148 strikeouts. Wearing uniform number 11, Choi hurled 9 complete games and one shutout, and was ranked fourth in ERA and strikeouts.

Choi established himself in 1984 with a breakout season for the Giants. He was 27–13, ranked first in wins, and fanned a league-leading 223 batters during the season. Choi also lowered his ERA to 2.40, and posted the second-highest innings pitched total in a season in KBO history with 284.2 (on the contrary, ERA champion Jang Ho-yeon pitched only 102.1 innings in the season). In the 1984 Korean Series, the Giants beat the Samsung Lions in seven games. Choi started for the Giants four times and threw four complete-games with a 3–1 record as a starter, with his final outing being Game 7. Choi accumulated one more win as a long reliever in Game 6, coming up on relief in the fifth inning and hurling five shutout innings with six strikeouts. As a clutch "iron arm" pitcher, Choi finished the Series with an astonishing 4–1 record and an ERA of 1.80 in 40 innings pitched in nine days. He threw a total of 610 pitches throughout the Series. He still holds the most unbreakable records for most wins (4) and most innings pitched (40.0) in a single championship series.

Choi's 1986 season ended as one of the finest he had ever posted. He posted a 19-14 record and an ERA of 1.55 with 208 strikeouts in 267 innings pitched. Choi pitched a career-high 17 complete games and his 1.55 ERA was the lowest of his eight-season career. He led the league in innings pitched, and was runner-up in wins, ERA and strikeouts (208).

He has pitched one of the finest games of his career in the 1987 season: On May 16, in a 2-2 game against the Haitai Tigers, Choi completed a game of no-decision through 15 innings - he pitched 209 pitches in total. The opposing pitcher Sun Dong-Yeol, also regarded as one of the finest in the league, also completed the game, ending up pitching 232 pitches. This matchup of the two Korean ace pitchers is often considered as one of the best moments in Korean baseball history.

Samsung Lions
Prior to the 1989 season, Choi was traded with Kim Yong-chul to the Samsung Lions for Jang Hyo-jo and Kim Si-jin. After the trade, his career quickly spiraled downward. His statistics did not improve while with the Lions. In just over two years with the Lions, he posted a 7–7 record with an ERA of 4.50.

Choi became the first member of the 1,000 strikeout club on May 20, 1990 when he fanned Lee Kwang-Eun of the LG Twins in the fifth inning in Daegu. However, after the 1990 season, Choi announced his retirement from baseball as a player.

Post playing career
Choi Retired in 1990 and then dabbled in politics. The following year, he left Korea to study baseball in New York, did some baseball broadcasting work and acted after he came back to Korea 2years later. After 2001 he returned to baseball as the minor league manager for the Hanwha Eagles (2007–2009) and supervisor for the KBO (2009–2011).

Death and memorial

Choi died of colon cancer at a hospital in Goyang, Gyeonggi-do on September 14, 2011, aged 53. Choi was survived by wife, one son, mother and two younger brothers.

The Lotte Giants retired Choi's squad number 11 on September 30, 2011. The number is the club's first-ever retired number since the club was founded in 1975. He was portrayed by Cho Seung-woo in the 2011 film, Perfect Game about the two top pitchers him and his rival Sun Dong-Yeol in the Korea Baseball Organization league during the 1980s.

References

External links
 Career statistics and player information from Korea Baseball Organization (Official website)

Hanwha Eagles coaches
South Korean baseball coaches
Lotte Giants players
Samsung Lions players
KBO League pitchers
South Korean baseball players
Baseball players with retired numbers
Baseball announcers
Deaths from colorectal cancer
Deaths from cancer in South Korea
Yonsei University alumni
Kyungnam High School alumni
1958 births
2011 deaths
Sportspeople from Busan